Westgate is a quickly developing regional town centre in the northwest of West Auckland in Auckland, New Zealand. The suburb in which it is located was changed from "Massey North" to "Westgate" in 2013. The area was part of Waitakere City from 1989 to 2010 and its transformation is now a priority for Auckland Council.

The new regional town centre being built will be the hub for retail and commercial activity in the north west. The council has a number of development partners and will itself create the centre's new civic heart including a new library - Te Manawa located south-west to Te Pumanawa Square. NorthWest Shopping Centre located north-east to Te Pumanawa Square opened on 1 October 2015. As a part of NorthWest Stage 2 development, restaurants, retailers and offices around Te Pumanawa Square have gradually opened their doors since October 2016. The town square will feature areas for outdoor dining and the large civic space will be pedestrian friendly. A high quality and extensive network of parks and walkways will also be created.

Linking to Westgate's rapid commercial development, a Costco Wholesale warehouse club opened on 28 September 2022: the first in New Zealand. It currently has a food court, petrol station, tyre centre, and optometrist.

Demographics

Westgate Central had a population of 42 at the 2018 New Zealand census, a decrease of 36 people (−46.2%) since the 2013 census, and a decrease of 45 people (−51.7%) since the 2006 census. There were 15 households, comprising 24 males and 18 females, giving a sex ratio of 1.33 males per female. The median age was 37.5 years (compared with 37.4 years nationally), with 6 people (14.3%) aged under 15 years, 9 (21.4%) aged 15 to 29, 21 (50.0%) aged 30 to 64, and 3 (7.1%) aged 65 or older.

Ethnicities were 57.1% European/Pākehā, 28.6% Māori, 0.0% Pacific peoples, and 28.6% Asian. People may identify with more than one ethnicity.

The percentage of people born overseas was 21.4, compared with 27.1% nationally.

Although people could chose not to answer the census's question about religious affiliation, 50.0% had no religion, 35.7% were Christian, and 14.3% were Muslim.

Of those at least 15 years old, 3 (8.3%) people had a bachelor's or higher degree, and 9 (25.0%) people had no formal qualifications. The median income was $31,700, compared with $31,800 nationally. 6 people (16.7%) earned over $70,000 compared to 17.2% nationally. The employment status of those at least 15 was that 15 (41.7%) people were employed full-time, and 6 (16.7%) were part-time.

Economy

NorthWest Shopping Centre was established in Westgate in 2015. It covers 27,000 m² with about 100 retailers, including Farmers and Countdown. It has about 1100 carparks.

Westgate Lifestyle opened in 2017. It covers 25,604 m², with 622 carparks. There are 28 retailers, including Harvey Norman, Briscoes, Rebel Sport and Freedom Furniture.

Westgate Shopping Centre was established in 1998. It covers 18,916 m² with 1350 carparks. The centre has 88 shops, including The Warehouse and Countdown.

References

External links
Photographs of Westgate held in Auckland Libraries' heritage collections.

Suburbs of Auckland
Henderson-Massey Local Board Area
West Auckland, New Zealand